We Go Home is Adam Cohen's fourth studio album.

Track listing
"Song of Me and You" - 3:13
"Too Real" - 4:20
"We Go Home" - 3:13
"Put Your Bags Down" - 3:26
"So Much to Learn" - 3:27
"Uniform" - 2:59
"Love Is" - 2:38
"What Kind of Woman" - 3:50
"Fall Apart" - 3:56
"Swear I Was There" - 4:25
"Boats" - 1:29
Bonus tracks on Deluxe edition
"Sun" - 3:17
"Don't Crack" - 2:48

Personnel 
 Adam Cohen – guitar, vocals
 Mai Bloomfield – vocals, cello, papoose
 Geneviève Clermont – violin
 Marie-Pierre Lecault – violin
 Stéphanie Collerette – cello
 Michael Chaves (as Don Miguel) – guitar, keyboards, producer
 Al Vermue – engineer
 Oli Scoble – assistant engineer
 Bill Bottrell – mixing
 Jeff Gartenbaum – assistant mixing

Charts

References

2014 albums
Adam Cohen (musician) albums
Cooking Vinyl albums